T. darwinii may refer to:
 Thraupis darwinii, the blue-and-yellow tanager, a bird species
 Tiquilia darwinii, a plant species endemic to Ecuador
 Trianguloscalpellum darwinii, a species of stalked barnacle, family Scalpellidae

See also
 T. darwini (disambiguation)
 Darwinii (disambiguation)